Nouha Diakité (born 20 December 1980) is a French-born Malian basketball player. He is a member of the Mali national basketball team.

In his most recent professional season, 2008–09, Diakate bounced from BK Prostejov of the Czech League to Hyeres-Toulon Var Basket of the French League before landing with CB Illescas Urban CLM in Spain for the last 14 games of the season.  On 31 August 2009, he signed with Pau-Orthez of the Ligue Nationale de Basketball.

Nouha Diakité has played for the Mali national basketball team in the FIBA Africa Championship in 2005, 2007, and 2009.  The team reached the quarterfinals in each of these appearances.

References

1980 births
Living people
Aix Maurienne Savoie Basket players
ASVEL Basket players
Barton Cougars men's basketball players
Centers (basketball)
Élan Béarnais players
French men's basketball players
French sportspeople of Malian descent
HTV Basket players
JA Vichy players
Louisville Cardinals men's basketball players
Malian men's basketball players
People from Athis-Mons
Citizens of Mali through descent
Sportspeople from Essonne